Nasrullah is a masculine given name, commonly found in the Arabic language and is used by Muslims and Christians alike. It may also be transliterated as Nasralla, Nasrollah, Nasrullah, and Al-Nasrallah. Bearing the surname often indicates that the family adopted the name Nasrallah from one of its patrilineal ancestors.

Notable persons 
Notable persons with the name Nasrallah and its variants include:

United States 
 Nasrallah Onea "Naz" Worthen (born 1966), American football wide receiver

Egypt 
 Yousry Nasrallah (born 1952), Egyptian film director

Honduras 
 Salvador Nasralla (born 1953), Honduran media personality, TV presenter, politician, founder of Honduran Anti-Corruption Party

Iraq 
In Iraq, the most notable family to carry the name is the Alid Faizid family of Nasrallah from Karbala. However, there are other Alid and non-Alid families that carry the name, that come from Hindiyah, Hillah, and Nasiriyah.

 Nasrallah al-Haeri (1696–1746), Iraqi scholar and poet
 Jawad Nasrallah (d. 1808), Iraqi nobleman and custodian of Imam Husayn Shrine
 Hassan Nasrallah (1881–1959), Iraqi nobleman, activist, and businessman
 Murtadha Nasrallah (1922–2005), Iraqi law professor
 Hashem Nasrallah (1923–1997), Iraqi businessman and chairman of Karbala's chamber of commerce
 Mohammed Hussain Nasrallah (born 1951), Iraqi judge and prosecutor
 Abdul Sahib Nasrallah (born 1951), Iraqi author and custodian of Imam Husayn Shrine
 Aref Nasrallah (born 1958), Iraqi social activist and philanthropist

Iran 
 Abu'l-Ma'ali Nasrallah, Persian poet, statesman and vizier
 Moein (singer), Iranian Singer
 Nasrallah Shah-Abadi, Iranian Shia Cleric, Politician
 Nasrollah Jahangard, Iranian Politician
 Nasrollah Sajjadi, Iranian Politician & Sports Administrator
 Nasrollah Pejmanfar, Iranian Shia Cleric, Politician

Kazakhstan 
Nauryzbai Batyr

Kuwait 
In Kuwait, the most notable family to carry the name is known as the family of Al-Nasrallah. They trace back to the Anazzah tribe, and migrated from Sudair. They reside mainly in Jiblah and Jahrah. 

 Danah Al-Nasrallah (born 1988), Kuwaiti female track and field athlete

Lebanon 
In Lebanon, the name can be found in Shia, Sunni, Druze, and Christian families all across Lebanon, and they trace back to Sednayah, Hauran and Babylon. 

 Nasrallah Boutros Sfeir (1923–1997), Lebanese patriarch of Lebanon's largest Christian body
 Emily Nasrallah (1931–2018), Lebanese writer and women's rights activist
 Hassan Nasrallah (born 1960), Secretary General of the Lebanese political party Hezbollah
  Hassan Nasrallah (born 1982), Lebanese footballer

Mexico 
 Jesús Nader Nasrallah (born 1959), Mexican politician

Pakistan 
 Nasrullah Khan (footballer) (born 1985), Pakistani football midfielder
 Mir Ahmed Nasrallah Thattvi, 16th-century Muslim geographer and historian

Palestine 
In Palestine, it is believed that the Nasrallah family traces back to either the one that originated in the Levant (North Syria and Rif-Dimashq), or in the Arabian Peninsula (Saudi Arabia and Yemen). They reside mainly in Qaqun.

 Adel Gharib Nasrallah, birth name of Eddie Nash (1929–2014), Palestinian-American convicted gangster and drug dealer
 Ibrahim Nasrallah (born 1954), Jordanian-Palestinian poet